Ko Po Tsuen is a village in the Kam Tin area of Yuen Long District, Hong Kong.

Administration
Ko Po is a recognized village under the New Territories Small House Policy. Ko Po Tsuen is one of the villages represented within the Kam Tin Rural Committee. For electoral purposes, Ko Po Tsuen is part of the Kam Tin constituency, which is currently represented by Chris Li Chung-chi.

References

External links
 Delineation of area of existing village Ko Po Tsuen (Kam Tin) for election of resident representative (2019 to 2022) (also covers Kam Hing Wai)
 Blog entry with photographs of Ko Po Tsuen (in Chinese)

Villages in Yuen Long District, Hong Kong
Kam Tin